The Reserve Division of Fuxin was activated in December 1983 in Fuxin, Liaoning. The division was then composed of:
1st Garrison Regiment - Fuxin County
2nd Garrison Regiment - Xihe district, Fuxin
3rd Garrison Regiment - Zhangwu
Artillery Regiment - Taiping district, Fuxin
Tank Regiment - Haihe district, Fuxin
Special Troops Regiment - Chaoyang

In November 1985 it was redesignated as the Reserve Garrison Division of Fuxin(). 

The division was composed of 9,026 personnel. Apart from small arms, the division possessed 4 85 mm guns, 4 100 mm mortars, 4 122 mm howitzers, 4 107 mm MRLs, 4 twin-37 mm AAA guns, 4 14.5 mm AAMGs, and 11 tractor vehicles. While organized with a tank regiment, the division virtually had no tanks. 

In late 1986, the 2nd Garrison Regiment was reconfigured as the Engineer Battalion, Reserve Garrison Division of Fuxin.

On March 18, 1988, the division was further redesignated as the Reserve Infantry Division of Fuxin(). The division was then composed of:
1st Infantry Regiment
2nd Infantry Regiment
3rd Infantry Regiment
Artillery Regiment
Tank Regiment
Special Troops Regiment

On December 1, 1998, the division was merged into the 192nd Infantry Division as the 192nd Reserve Infantry Division of Liaoning Provincial Military District.

References

Reserve divisions of the People's Liberation Army
Military units and formations established in 1983